Wolfiporia sulphurea is a species of fungus in the family Polyporaceae. First described in 1917 as Merulius sulphureus by Edward Angus Burt, it was transferred to the genus Wolfiporia by James Herbert Ginns in 1984.

References

Polyporaceae
Fungi described in 1917
Fungi of North America